The Big Show is an American comedy-variety-musical television series produced and broadcast by NBC for several months in 1980.

The series aimed to revitalize the moribund variety television genre, which had been in a downward spiral for several years. The Big Show took its title seriously, using a huge stage set (complete with a live audience and an ice rink and swimming pool) and filling a 90-minute time-slot (one of the only variety programs in American television history to run this length), with at least one two-hour installment broadcast. It was in many respects a revival and television adaptation of The Big Show, which had aired on the NBC Radio Network from 1950 to 1951 and likewise was a big-budget, 90-minute weekly variety show designed to prevent old-time radio from fading into history.

Although the first broadcast received high ratings, poor reviews and low ratings of succeeding episodes (typical of NBC during the Fred Silverman era) resulted in the program being cancelled after only a few months on May 8, 1980. The series nonetheless was nominated for six Emmy Awards, winning for Outstanding Costume Design.

Regular performers included Joe Baker, Mimi Kennedy, Shabba-Doo, Charlie Hill, and Pamela Myers. Guest hosts included Steve Allen, Nell Carter, Graham Chapman, David Copperfield, Geoffrey Holder, Gary Coleman, and Sid Caesar.  Skaters who performed in the show included Peggy Fleming, Dorothy Hamill, John Curry, and Toller Cranston.

External links
 

1980 American television series debuts
1980 American television series endings
1980s American musical comedy television series
1980s American variety television series
NBC original programming
Figure skating on television